7X or 7-X may refer to:

7x, or seven times in multiplication
Dassault Falcon 7X
Saab 9-7X
Wendelstein 7-X 
Merchandise 7X; see Coca-Cola formula
Avenged 7X, nickname for  Avenged Sevenfold 
Platinum 7X, A brand of vodka
Spartan 7X Executive; see Spartan Executive
7X Energy, Inc.

See also
X7 (disambiguation)